The Song We Fell in Love To is the twenty-seventh solo studio album by American country singer Connie Smith. It was released in March 1976 on Columbia Records. The album contained ten tracks of material crafted in a country pop style that featured overdubbed vocal harmonies by Smith herself. Two singles were included on the project: the title track and a cover of The Everly Brothers's "(Till) I Kissed You". The latter single became Smith's first top ten American single in several years. The album itself peaked in the top 40 of the American Country LP's chart in 1976.

Background
After 18 top ten singles with the RCA Victor label, Connie Smith signed a new contract with Columbia Records in the early 1970s. She would continue to have commercial success, but most of her singles placed in the top 20. Her top ten and 20 singles at Columbia included "Ain't Love a Good Thing" (1973), "I Never Knew (What That Song Meant Before)" (1974), "I've Got My Baby on My Mind" (1975) and "Why Don't You Love Me" (1975). In 1975, Smith began recording her next Columbia studio project, which would later be titled The Song We Fell in Love To. The album's name was derived from its title track, which was issued as a single. The single's country pop production style helped form the sound for the project.

Recording and content
Smith went into the studio in the summer of 1975 to make The Song We Fell in Love To. Specifically, the album was recorded over three studio sessions: June 11, August 14 and September 8, 1975. Two overdub sessions were also added that featured string instrumentation and vocal harmonies. The album was cut at Columbia Studio B, located in Nashville, Tennessee. Ray Baker served as the project's producer and had been serving as Smith's producer since 1973. Baker and Tupper Saussy collaborated to compose the project's title track. "We had an idea and sat down and wrote 'The Song We Fell in Love To,' and it came off really well, with a good melody; the words were good too," Baker remembered. Smith recalled liking the song after hearing it and agreed to record it. 

Along with the title track, the album consisted of ten songs. Three songs on the album were penned by Dallas Frazier: "Because I Love You That's Why", "Ridin' on a Rainbow" and "Viva La Love". On both "Ridin' on a Rainbow" and "Viva La Love", Smith harmonized with herself by overdubbing her vocals. Singer-songwriter Don Gibson penned the track "Nothing in This World". Ray Baker had Smith re-record her 1964 number one debut single, "Once a Day". "We got a good record on it, but, really, the one that she'd done with Bob Ferguson [her RCA producer] was magic – and her career maker," Baker recalled. Smith also chose The Everly Brothers's pop single for the project, "(Till) I Kissed You". "It had been long enough that it just needed to be heard again," she commented. Per Smith's contract agreement, she was allowed to include two gospel songs onto her secular albums. For The Song We Fell in Love To, she included the songs "Jesus Hears, He Cares, He Can" and "When I Need Jesus, He's There".

Release and singles
The Song We Fell in Love To was released by Columbia Records in March 1976. It was the twenty ninth studio album of Smith's career and her seventh with the Columbia label. The label distributed the album as a vinyl LP, with five songs on either side of the record. The album debuted on the American Billboard Country LP's chart on March 27, 1976. It spent six weeks on the chart and peaked at number 34 on April 10, 1976. Two singles were included on the project. Its first was the title track, which was released as a single by Columbia in September 1975. It peaked in the top 40 of the Billboard Hot Country Songs chart in November 1975, climbing to the number 29 position. Smith's cover of "(Till) I Kissed You" was issued as a single in January 1976. By April 1976, the song became Smith's twentieth top ten single on the Billboard country chart, peaking at number 10. It was also her first Billboard top ten single since 1974. In Canada, "(Till) I Kissed You" became her second single to reach number one on their RPM country chart.

Track listing

Personnel
All credits are adapted from the liner notes of The Song We Fell in Love To and the biography booklet by Barry Mazor titled The Latest Shade of Blue.

Musical personnel
 Byron Bach – Strings
 Brenton Banks – Strings
 George Binkley III – Strings
 Marvin Chantry – Strings
 Roy Christensen – Strings
 Ray Edenton – Rhythm guitar
 Johnny Gimble – Fiddle
 Carl Gorodetzky – Strings
 Lloyd Green – Steel guitar
 The Jordanaires – Background vocals
 Shayne Keister – Electric piano
 Shelly Kurland – Strings
 Carol Lee Cooper – Organ
 Kenny Malone – Drums

 Grady Martin – Guitar, leader
 Charlie McCoy – Harmonica
 Bob Moore – Electric bass
 Weldon Myrick – Steel guitar
 The Nashville Edition – Background vocals
 Leon Rhodes – Guitar
 Hargus "Pig" Robbins – Piano
 Connie Smith – Lead vocals
 Steven Smith – Strings
 Buddy Spicher – Fiddle
 Pamela Stein – Strings
 Henry Strzelecki – Electric bass
 Bobby Thompson – Guitar
 Gary Van Osdale – Strings
 Stephanie Woolf – Strings

Technical personnel
 Ray Baker – Percussion, producer
 Bill Barnes – Design
 Lou Bradley – Engineer
 Al Clayton – Cover photo
 Jim Hall – Leader, string arrangement

Chart performance

Release history

References

Footnotes

Books

 

1976 albums
Albums produced by Ray Baker (music producer)
Connie Smith albums
Columbia Records albums